Daisy Grace Wilson Cleverley (born 30 April 1997) is a New Zealand footballer who currently plays as a midfielder for HB Køge in the Elitedivisionen and the New Zealand national team.

College
Cleverley enrolled at the University of California, Berkeley in spring 2017. She played 14 matches for the Golden Bears in her freshman year, scoring her first collegiate goal on 19 October 2017 in a 1–0 win over Oregon State before suffering a season-ending ACL injury.

International career

Youth
Cleverley was a member of the New Zealand U-17 side at the 2012 FIFA U-17 Women's World Cup in Azerbaijan and again at the 2014 FIFA U-17 Women's World Cup in Costa Rica, playing all of New Zealand's group games at both tournaments.

At the 2014 FIFA U-20 Women's World Cup in Canada, Cleverley played in all three of New Zealand's group games and the quarter final match which they lost to Nigeria.

Senior
On 25 October 2014, Cleverley made her senior international debut, starting in a 16–0 win over Tonga and scoring two goals.

She was part of New Zealand's squad at the 2015 FIFA Women's World Cup in Canada. In 2019, Cleverley was included in her second World Cup squad.

International goals

References

External links

 Profile at NZF
 
 Cal player profile

1997 births
Living people
New Zealand women's association footballers
2015 FIFA Women's World Cup players
Association footballers from Auckland
New Zealand women's international footballers
California Golden Bears women's soccer players
Women's association football midfielders
2019 FIFA Women's World Cup players
Footballers at the 2020 Summer Olympics
Olympic association footballers of New Zealand
Georgetown Hoyas women's soccer players
Expatriate women's footballers in Denmark
Expatriate women's soccer players in the United States
New Zealand expatriate sportspeople in Denmark
New Zealand expatriate sportspeople in the United States
New Zealand expatriate women's association footballers
HB Køge (women) players